Sylvain Houles (born 3 August 1981) is the head coach of Toulouse Olympique in the Betfred Championship and a French former professional rugby league footballer.

As a player, Houles was a French international who toured New Zealand and Papua New Guinea in 2001 and appeared in the Super League for the Huddersfield Giants, the London Broncos and the Wakefield Trinity Wildcats. He also played in the Championship for the Dewsbury Rams and Toulouse Olympique.

Houles combined playing with an assistant coach role in his later career, was appointed head coach of Toulouse Olympique once his playing career ended in 2012.

On 10 October 2021, Houles coached Toulouse to victory over Featherstone in the Million Pound Game which saw the club promoted to the Super League for the first time in their history.

References

External links

Toulouse Olympique profile
Wayne’s world in Rams romp
GREAT BRITAIN LIONS 42 FRANCE 14
England battle to French wins

1981 births
Living people
Dewsbury Rams players
France national rugby league team players
French rugby league coaches
French rugby league players
Huddersfield Giants players
London Broncos players
Rugby league centres
Rugby league locks
Rugby league wingers
Toulouse Olympique coaches
Toulouse Olympique players
Wakefield Trinity players
XIII Catalan players